Pool C of the 2016 Fed Cup Europe/Africa Group III was one of four pools in the Europe/Africa Group III of the 2016 Fed Cup. Four teams competed in a round robin competition, with the top team and bottom teams proceeding to their respective sections of the play-offs: the top team played for advancement to Group II.

Standings

Round-robin

Moldova vs. Madagascar

Cyprus vs. Algeria

Moldova vs. Algeria

Cyprus vs. Madagascar

Moldova vs. Cyprus

Algeria vs. Madagascar

See also
Fed Cup structure

References

External links
 Fed Cup website

A3
Sport in Ulcinj